Ryan Tongia (born 31 May 1990, in Brisbane) is a professional rugby league and rugby union footballer. He is currently based out of Hawke’s bay in New Zealand. Tongia is of Papua New Guinean, Chinese and German descent, but was born and raised in Australia. His position is right or left wing, or fullback. He is a Papua New Guinea rugby league international. Tongia was not an age grade star growing up, but through hard work and determination he worked his way to the pros. He got his first real taste of professional rugby league at the Cronulla Sharks [NRL] before moving to Wakefield Trinity in the [Super League]. Tongia changed to Rugby Union in 2013. He played for the Otago Highlanders in New Zealand in 2015 and 2016. He has also played for Hawke’s Bay and Southland in the NPC (New Zealand Provincial Competition) known as Mitre 10 cup previously. (rugby union)| Tongia also spent time in Europe playing for Avignon Bayonne (rugby union) SUA (rugby union) in French Top 14 & Pro-D2 respectively.

He now runs a business [F45 Hastings NZ] coaching health and fitness, Helping hundreds of people become fitter, healthier and happier versions of themselves.

Playing career
During his time playing rugby league for the Gold Coast Titans, Tongia did not play first grade but played in the Toyota Cup. He played two matches for Papua New Guinea in the 2010 Rugby League Four Nations. Tongia also played for the Wakefield Trinity Wildcats in 2011.

2014–16
Being unsuccessful on securing an NRL contract, Tongia made the decision to switch to rugby union in late 2013. He took part in the Noosa International Sevens tournament at the end of 2013, impressing enough people to be invited to the Australian sevens training camp. He then moved to New Zealand, in July 2014, it was announced that Tongia had signed a one-season contract with Hawke's Bay for 2014 after impressing at club rugby level. He became a key member and a star performer in their ITM Cup campaign, winning the Ranfurly Shield and making the Championship final. He also was the competition's leading overall top try-scorer, scoring 10 tries. It saw Tongia achieve a Super Rugby contract, after signing with Dunedin-based franchise the Highlanders for two years as a member of their wider training group.

Tongia was cited for foul play during a trial match for the Highlanders prior to the 2015 Super Rugby season. He was alleged for dangerous tackling when he tackled Robbie Coleman in the air against the Brumbies in January. The referee for the match, Matt O'Brien, issued a red card for the incident which occurred in the 59th minute. Tongia was cleared of foul play, the red card was later removed from his record and would face no further punishment after it was revealed it was an incorrect call. He made his Super Rugby debut in the wing position against the Cheetahs. He scored twice within 18 minutes of kick-off after a 45–24 victory.

2017–19
After a brief stint for the Agen club in France to play Pro14 rugby, Tongia joined Southland.

2021

References

External links
New Guinea Profile at rlfournations.com
Statistics at rugbyleagueproject.org
Leeds Rhinos 64-20 Wakefield Trinity Wildcats
Wakefield Trinity Wildcats 26-14 Bradford Bulls
Super League 2012: Dave Woods' pre-season verdict
PNG star Ryan Tongia set to light up Cronulla Sharks

1990 births
Australian expatriate rugby league players
Australian expatriate rugby union players
Australian expatriate sportspeople in England
Australian expatriate sportspeople in France
Australian expatriate sportspeople in New Zealand
Australian people of Chinese descent
Australian people of German descent
Australian people of Papua New Guinean descent
Australian rugby league players
Aviron Bayonnais players
Expatriate rugby league players in England
Expatriate rugby union players in France
Expatriate rugby union players in New Zealand
Hawke's Bay rugby union players
Highlanders (rugby union) players
Living people
Papua New Guinea national rugby league team players
Rugby league fullbacks
Rugby league wingers
Rugby union fullbacks
Rugby union wings
Rugby union players from Brisbane
Rugby league players from Brisbane
Wakefield Trinity players
Australian rugby union players
SU Agen Lot-et-Garonne players
Southland rugby union players
Waikato rugby union players
Rugby union centres